Orocrambus isochytus is a moth in the family Crambidae. It was described by Edward Meyrick in 1888. This species is endemic to New Zealand.  It is found in the Nelson area as defined by the Crosby codes, the New Zealand Area Codes for recording specimen localities.  It has been recorded from Mount Arthur and Mount Peel. The habitat of this species consists of alpine tussock grasslands.

The wingspan is 35–41 mm. Adults have been recorded from December to February.

References

Crambinae
Moths described in 1888
Moths of New Zealand
Endemic fauna of New Zealand
Taxa named by Edward Meyrick
Endemic moths of New Zealand